Clemensia leisova is a moth of the family Erebidae. It is found in Mexico.

References

Cisthenina
Moths described in 1910